Haris Radetinac (born 28 October 1985) is a Bosnian-born Swedish professional footballer who plays as a midfielder for Allsvenskan club Djurgårdens IF.

Career
Radetinac was born in Serbia but moved to Linköping, Sweden as an 18-year-old. There he joined local side Linköpings FF and eventually started playing with their first team in the fourth and fifth tier of Swedish football. In 2007, he was picked up by nearby Superettan team Åtvidabergs FF where he became an immediate starter and only missed five league games during his five years with the club. In 2009 Åtvidaberg was promoted to Allsvenskan for the first time since 1982, but was immediately relegated again the following year. Even though the club won promotion again in the 2011 Superettan he still made the move to another Allsvenskan side, Mjällby AIF, at the end of that year.

During the summer of 2013 he was offered a contract by Stockholm based club AIK but instead chose to sign a 3.5 year deal with their archrivals Djurgårdens IF. In the beginning he struggled for his new club, but after the new manager Per Olsson arrived Radetinac regained his form and was considered one of the best players in the league when he suffered an ACL injury which made him miss the second half of the 2015 Allsvenskan season. On 10 May 2018 he played as Djurgården beat Malmö FF 3-0 in the Swedish Cup Final.

International career
The Bosnia and Herzegovina national football team showed interest in Radetinac while he was playing for Mjällby and he was included in a preliminary squad of theirs but never picked for the final squad of an international game.

Personal
One of the career goals for Radetinac has been to play football in Italy, preferably for A.S. Roma.

Honours
Djurgårdens IF
 Allsvenskan: 2019
 Svenska Cupen: 2017–18

Individual 
 Årets Järnkamin: 2020

References

External links
 
 Eliteprospects Football profile

1985 births
Living people
Sportspeople from Novi Pazar
Serbian footballers
Bosniaks of Serbia
Åtvidabergs FF players
Djurgårdens IF Fotboll players
Mjällby AIF players
Allsvenskan players
Superettan players
FK Novi Pazar players
Association football midfielders